Legislative elections were held in Åland on 20 October 1975 to elect members of the Landstinget. The 30 members were elected for a four-year term by proportional representation.

There were apparentments between Åland Social Democrats and ÅSU; Liberals, Freeminded Co-operation and Samlad Åländsk Ungdom; and between FS–framsteg and Åländska Förbundet.

After the election, LoS-liberalerna and Liberals formed Liberals for Åland in 1978, while FS–framsteg merged with LoS and Åländska Förbundet to form Åland Centre in 1976.

Results

References

External links

Elections in Åland
Aland
1975 in Finland
October 1975 events in Europe